The 2000 Pennsylvania 500 was the 19th stock car race of the 2000 NASCAR Winston Cup Series and the 28th iteration of the event. The race was held on Sunday, July 23, 2000, in Long Pond, Pennsylvania, at Pocono Raceway, a 2.5 miles (4.0 km) triangular permanent course. The race took the scheduled 200 laps to complete. On the final lap of the race, leader of the race, Penske-Kranefuss Racing driver Jeremy Mayfield would blow a tire heading into the second turn. Behind Mayfield, two drivers battling for position, teammate Rusty Wallace and Roush Racing driver Jeff Burton were battling for the second position, When Mayfield blew a tire, the two passed Mayfield, leading the two of them to battle for the lead. At the end of the race, Wallace was able to defend Burton to claim his 51st career NASCAR Winston Cup Series victory and his second victory of the season. To fill out the top three, the aforementioned Jeff Burton and Hendrick Motorsports driver Jeff Gordon would finish second and third, respectively.

Background 

The race was held at Pocono Raceway, which is a three-turn superspeedway located in Long Pond, Pennsylvania. The track hosts two annual NASCAR Sprint Cup Series races, as well as one Xfinity Series and Camping World Truck Series event. Until 2019, the track also hosted an IndyCar Series race.

Pocono Raceway is one of a very few NASCAR tracks not owned by either Speedway Motorsports, Inc. or International Speedway Corporation. It is operated by the Igdalsky siblings Brandon, Nicholas, and sister Ashley, and cousins Joseph IV and Chase Mattioli, all of whom are third-generation members of the family-owned Mattco Inc, started by Joseph II and Rose Mattioli.

Outside of the NASCAR races, the track is used throughout the year by Sports Car Club of America (SCCA) and motorcycle clubs as well as racing schools and an IndyCar race. The triangular oval also has three separate infield sections of racetrack – North Course, East Course and South Course. Each of these infield sections use a separate portion of the tri-oval to complete the track. During regular non-race weekends, multiple clubs can use the track by running on different infield sections. Also some of the infield sections can be run in either direction, or multiple infield sections can be put together – such as running the North Course and the South Course and using the tri-oval to connect the two.

Entry list 

 (R) denotes rookie driver.

Practice

First practice 
The first practice session was held on Friday, July 21, at 11:00 AM EST. The session would last for three hours.

Second practice 
The second practice session was held on Saturday, July 22, at 9:30 AM EST. The session would last for one hour and 20 minutes.

Final practice 
The final practice session, sometimes referred to as Happy Hour, was held on Saturday, July 22, after the preliminary 2000 Pepsi ARCA 200 ARCA Re/Max Series race. The session would last for one hour.

Qualifying 
Qualifying was split into two rounds. The first round was held on Friday, July 21, at 3:00 PM EST. Each driver would have one lap to set a time. During the first round, the top 25 drivers in the round would be guaranteed a starting spot in the race. If a driver was not able to guarantee a spot in the first round, they had the option to scrub their time from the first round and try and run a faster lap time in a second round qualifying run, held on Saturday, July 22, at 11:30 AM EST. As with the first round, each driver would have one lap to set a time. Positions 26-36 would be decided on time, while positions 37-43 would be based on provisionals. Six spots are awarded by the use of provisionals based on owner's points. The seventh is awarded to a past champion who has not otherwise qualified for the race. If no past champion needs the provisional, the next team in the owner points will be awarded a provisional.

Two drivers would fail to qualify.

Full qualifying results

Race results

References 

2000 NASCAR Winston Cup Series
NASCAR races at Pocono Raceway
July 2000 sports events in the United States
2000 in sports in Pennsylvania